The Sea of Crete (Kritiko Pelagos), or Cretan Sea, is a sea, part of the Aegean Sea, located in its southern extremity, with a total surface area of . The sea stretches to the north of the island of Crete, east of the islands of Kythera and Antikythera, south of the Cyclades, and west of the Dodecanese islands of Rhodes, Karpathos and Kassos. The bounding sea to the west is the Ionian Sea. To the northwest is the Myrtoan Sea, a subdivision of the Mediterranean Sea that lies between the Cyclades and Peloponnese. To the east-southeast is the rest of the Mediterranean Sea, sometimes credited as the Levantine Sea. Across the island of Crete, to the opposite shore of it begins the Libyan Sea. Ferry routes to and from Piraeus and Heraklion, as well as the southern islands of the Aegean and the Dodecanese, run in this area.

Just off the coastline of Northeastern Crete, the sea reaches a maximum depth of near 3,293 m (10,000 ft). Other sources (maps) show a maximum depth of 2,591 m (8,500 ft).

Port towns and cities
Kastelli-Kissamos, southwest
Chania, southwest
Souda, south-southwest
Rethymno, south
Heraklio, south
Agios Nikolaos, southeast
Sitia, southeast
Kassos (Fry), southeast
Anafi, northeast
Thira, north

Bays
Chania Bay, south
Souda Bay, southeast
Almyros Bay, south
Mirabello Bay, southeast

References

Crete, Sea of
Crete, Sea of
Crete
Landforms of Crete
Landforms of Chania (regional unit)
Landforms of Rethymno (regional unit)
Landforms of Heraklion (regional unit)
Landforms of Lasithi
Landforms of Karpathos (regional unit)
Landforms of Thira (regional unit)
Landforms of the South Aegean